"The Deal" is the fifth episode of the second season of the American television drama series The Americans, and the 18th overall episode of the series.  It originally aired on FX in the United States on March 26, 2014.

Plot
The Jennings capture and hide their attacker in an abandoned restaurant. The man turns out to be an agent of Mossad (the national intelligence agency of Israel), which prompts the Soviets to make a deal with Israel. Philip stays with their captive while the Soviets attempt to trade him for the scientist Anton. The Mossad agent aggravates Philip by discussing their roles in the war and says that where he "hides what he does", Philip "hides who he is".

Elizabeth receives Martha’s messages for Clark. Posing as Clark’s sister Jennifer, she convinces Martha not to put Clark’s name on an application form. Martha, who is drunk, tells "Jennifer" that Clark is an "animal in bed".

The FBI gets word that Anton is missing and realizes that the Soviets are trying to extract him.

Elizabeth gets Andrew Larrick's files from Mullen, who realizes that she will no longer be interested in a relationship with him.

The trade deal is made and, after swapping the Mossad agent for Anton, Philip drives Anton to a cargo ship headed for Russia. En route, Anton begs Philip to let him stay in America and work from there, breaking down in tears. Philip ignores him.

Based on Nina’s word, Stan deduces that Oleg Igerovich Burov would be the one transporting Anton and tails him. When they arrive at the docks, Oleg is waiting for Stan (Anton was taken to another location). Oleg tells Stan that he is the only one who knows Nina is working for him, and threatens to expose it if he gets nothing in return.

Production
The episode was written by Angelina Burnett and directed by Dan Attias.

Reception
The A.V. Club gave the episode an A. Alan Sepinwall from Hitfix said "the whole isn't as strong as the sum of the individual parts, because even though the parts are mostly terrific, there are too many of them."

References

External links
 "The Deal" at FX
 

The Americans (season 2) episodes
2014 American television episodes
Television episodes directed by Dan Attias